Trooperslane railway station serves the hamlet of Trooperslane in County Antrim, Northern Ireland.

There are plans to open a park and ride facility at the station.

The station was opened on 11 April 1848.

For many years it was served only by peak-time services on Mondays to Saturdays.  On a trial basis in the 1990s, one service each way made a request stop on a Sunday, however this was not a success.

When Northern Ireland Railways introduced a new clock-face timetable in the mid-2000s, the station once again saw a regular service seven days a week, with nearly all trains serving the station. Trooperslane also has a level crossing, supervised by closed-circuit television.

Service

On Saturdays, the service remains half-hourly, with fewer trains at peak times.

On Sundays, the service reduces to hourly operation in both directions.

References

Railway stations in County Antrim
Railway stations opened in 1848
Railway stations served by NI Railways
Railway stations in Northern Ireland opened in 1848